Anteater Stadium is a 2,500-seat multi-purpose stadium with a bermuda grass field on the campus of University of California, Irvine in Irvine, California, United States. It is used by the UC Irvine Anteaters men's & women's soccer and track and field teams.

History
The stadium hosted the women's division of the 1973 USA Outdoor Track and Field Championships.  The USC Trojans football team used the stadium for practices around 2000. In 2000, renovations added lights to Anteater Stadium. Anteater Stadium hosted the 2008 Big West Conference men's soccer tournament. The tournament final was the most-attended event at the stadium, with 1,832 people present. The stadium was the home stadium for United Soccer League minor-league professional soccer team Orange County Blues (now Orange County SC) from 2013 to 2016.

See also
Crawford Hall
List of soccer stadiums in the United States

References

External links
 Anteater Stadium

College soccer venues in California
UC Irvine Anteaters men's soccer
UC Irvine Anteaters women's soccer
UC Irvine Anteaters track and field
Sports venues in Irvine, California
Soccer venues in California
Athletics (track and field) venues in California
University of California, Irvine main campus buildings and structures
Sports venues completed in 2000